The Vermont Public Service Department is an agency within the executive branch of Vermont state government that is charged with representing the public interest in energy, telecommunications, and other utility matters.

External links 

 

Public Service Board
Government of Vermont